The 2001 Phillip Island V8 Supercar round was the first round of the 2001 Shell Championship Series. It was held on the weekend of 23 to 25 March at the Phillip Island Grand Prix Circuit in Victoria, Australia.

Race report 

The weekend was dominated by Mark Skaife and the Holden Racing Team. Taking pole position in the top-ten shootout followed by two victories, Skaife collected maximum points for the weekend. Craig Lowndes achieved second overall for the round in his first race weekend under the Ford banner and Jason Bright acquired third place in his return to the Shell Championship after he left for Indy Lights at the end of 1999.

Race results

Qualifying

Top Ten Shootout

Race 1 
In an action-packed opening lap that saw Jason Bargwanna and Mark Larkham spin off the track, Mark Skaife established a lead on the field that he would not relinquish. Following him was team-mate Jason Bright and rookie Marcos Ambrose. On lap 4, Ambrose pulled off an ambitious move on Bright for second place into Honda Hairpin. Behind them, Paul Radisich led a gaggle of cars that through to the mid-pack. Included in that bunch was Craig Lowndes, who had lost ground on the opening lap, and Greg Murphy, who was battling his way up from a poor qualifying position. John Bowe's race came to an end on lap 12 due to a suspected issue with the front-right suspension.

The pit window opened to allow for drivers to undertake their compulsory pitstops. Radisich lost a flurry of positions thanks to a slow stop - and would later encounter handling issues that would see him fall further down the pack. Lowndes meanwhile vaulted the pack up into third place, behind Bright. Up front, Skaife remained untroubled, taking the chequered flag by over 10 seconds. Bright, Lowndes, Ambrose, and Murphy rounded out the top five.

Race 2

Championship Standings 

Standings after Round 1

References

Phillip Island
Motorsport at Phillip Island